The Institute of Inspection, Cleaning and Restoration Certification, more commonly known as the IICRC, is a certification and standard-setting non-profit organization for the inspection, cleaning, and restoration industries. It is headquartered in Las Vegas, NV, United States, and has offices in the United Kingdom and Australia. The organization formulates health and safety related industry standards for built environment. As an American National Standards Institute (ANSI)-accredited standard-development organization (SDO), the IICRC works with international trade associations such as the International Sanitary Supply Association (ISSA) and the Restoration Industry Association(RIA) to develop consensus-based standards.

History 
The IICRC, originally named the International Institute of Carpet and Upholstery Cleaning Inc. (IICUC), was founded in 1972 by Ed York.  Since starting in 1972, the IICRC has evolved into a global organization with more than 53,000 active certified technicians and more than 6,000 Certified Firms around the world. IICRC is headquartered in Las Vegas, NV, United States, and has offices in the United Kingdom and Australia.

Certifications and Cleantrust program 
As a professional certification organization, the IICRC does not have members but instead has registered technicians or “registrants.” The IICRC does not operate certification schools but instead approves schools and instructors to teach and administer its certification programs.

Cleantrust is a certification program created by the IICRC. Currently, the IICRC has more than 140 approved instructors and 70 approved schools offering cleantrust certification. Certification is based upon successful completion of a course in which curriculum follows the standards for that category as well as a passing grade on a standardized exam. Once certified, IICRC registrants must earn continuing education credits (CECs) to maintain their certification. IICRC certification courses include over 20 qualifications in cleaning, inspection, and restoration.

Certifications 
The IICRC offers certifications in restoration, cleaning, and inspection. To earn an IICRC certification, a student must complete an IICRC certification course through an IICRC approved school, and passing the corresponding exam. The IICRC's certifications include:

 IICRC Water Restoration Technician (WRT) 
 IICRC Water Restoration Technician Español (WRT)
 IICRC Applied Structural Drying (ASD)
 IICRC Fire and Smoke Restoration Technician (FSRT)
 IICRC Odor Control Technician (OCT)
 IICRC Contents Processing Technician (CPT)
 IICRC Applied Microbial Remediation Technician (AMRT)
 IICRC Trauma and Crime Scene Cleanup Technician (TCST)
 IICRC Carpet Cleaning Technician (CCT)
 IICRC Upholstery & Fabric Cleaning Technician (UFT)

This is not a complete list of IICRC certifications offered.

Standards 
In addition to certification, the IICRC creates standards to help develop common, industry-accepted language and terminology regarding cleaning, inspection and restoration. The IICRC's standards include:
	
 BSR-IICRC S100 Standard and Reference Guide for Professional Cleaning of Textile Floor Coverings
 BSR-IICRC S210 Standard and Reference Guide for Dimension Stone Maintenance and Restoration
 IICRC S300 Standard and Reference Guide for Professional Upholstery Cleaning
 ANSI/IICRC S500 Standard and Reference Guide for Professional Water Damage Restoration
 BSR-IICRC S520 Standard and Reference Guide for Professional Mold Remediation
 BSR-IICRC S540 Standard and Reference Guide for Trauma and Crime Scene Biological and Infectious Hazard Clean Up
 BSR-IICRC S600 Standard and Reference Guide for Professional Carpet Installation
 BSR-IICRC S800 Standard and Reference Guide for Inspecting Textile Floor Coverings

Governance 
The IICRC is managed by a board of directors, which is composed of 15 members elected by the IICRC's shareholders. The elected board members are active in their respective industries and frequently represent the IICRC in media such as trade publications and consumer media.  The IICRC board of directors meets quarterly to formulate standards and create future policies.  The executive committee is composed of the organization's officers and is led by a chairman.

References

External links 
 IICRC Official Website

Cleaning
Standards organizations in the United States